The Cumberland Formation is a geologic formation in Kentucky. It dates back to the Ordovician period .

References
 Contributions to the Geology of Kentucky: Ordovician System

Ordovician Kentucky